is a Japanese adult video (AV) from 2006 which spawned a series of seven sequels, two compilation DVDs, a five part compilation for the 15 year anniversary of the original film and a spinoff by another Japanese Adult Video company.

Original
The first Naked Continent video was released on May 1, 2006 by the Natural High studio, part of the Soft On Demand (SOD) porn conglomerate. The movie is in a documentary travelog format as it follows a Japanese adult video (AV) actress Kaoruko Wakaba and the filming crew from Japan to Africa. Scenes with local people and various wildlife are interspersed with sex scenes in the 90 minute video. The director was  who has directed several other movies for Natural High.

Naked Continent was the Natural High entry (labeled OPEN-0654) in the 2006 AV Open contest which was decided by most sales during the period May + June 2006. The video, which was entered in the Challenge Stage for new directorial talent, took the 1st Place Award and was also given a second special award by the judges.

Sequels
Seven sequels and two compilation DVDs have been issued by Natural High in the years since the original video was released. All were also directed by Sakkun (サックン).

  was released on 19 October 2006 with production code NHDT-379. The 90 minute video starred Naoko Imokawa. The same documentary travelog mode was used but this time the scene of action was villages in Papua New Guinea.
  was released on 8 March 2007 with production code NHDT-423. The 90 minute video starred an unidentified actress. Once again in the traveog documentary style, this video is advertised as taking place down the Amazon River in a canoe. The video ranked number 18 in sales for SOD for October 2007.
  was released by Natural High on 8 November 2007 with production code NHDT-548. This 180 minute compilation video combined the original Naked Continent and the sequel Naked Continent 2 into a single package.
  was released on 8 May 2008 with production code NHDT-634. The 95 minute video starred AV actress Yuka Osawa. The area visited is described only as unexplored regions without cell phones. This version also sold well, ranking number 9 in sales for SOD for November 2008.
  was released on 18 September 2008 with production code NHDT-704. The 160 minute video starred actress Nana Saeki and in addition to the standard travel and sex scenes, this edition of the series features Saeki working as a volunteer with a charitable organization and children in Kenya. The Charity Project video was the 9th place bestseller for SOD for March 2009.
  was released on 5 March 2009 with production code NHDT-783. The 90 minute video starring actress Yuu Shiraishi was located in a "tribal" area.
  was released on December 19, 2009 with the production code NHDT-911. The four hour compilation DVD combines selected scenes from all six of the previous Naked Continent videos.
  was released on 22 April 2010 with the production code NHDT-959. The 120 minute video stars actress Yui Takagi and once again the crew and actress travel to Africa to exchange cultures.
 was released on 23 September 2012 with the production code NHDTA-286 and ran for 200 minutes. The DVD stars Nakano Arisa who in addition to the standard sex scenes, also performs a naked Ganges bath and a sex scene with an Indian religious ascetic (sadhu).

Anniversary Collection
On 10 October 2019, 5 DVDs titled  with the production code prefix "NHDTA-597-F" were released to celebrate the 15 year anniversary of Natural High. They featured selected scenes from previous Natural High releases.

Spinoff
In 19 October 2009, DANDY (another Japanese Adult Video producing studio) released a DVD titled  directed by Nagase Hawaii with the production code DANDY-155 and had a running time of 206 minutes.

Charity project
At a press conference in Shinjuku, Tokyo held in August 2008 by Natural High to promote the Naked Continent Charity Project video, the company announced they would be taking part in a charity project in Kenya. Sakkun, the director of the "Naked Continent" series, said he was struck by the poverty of children in Africa in his previous trips to the continent and he wanted to do something to help. The company was turned down by some charitable groups but found one organization who was interested, the Musona Self Help Group (MSHG), which helps orphans in western Kenya. Natural High donated 1 million yen (about $10,000 at the time) to the group with a further donation of 1,000 yen (about $10  at the time) for each copy of the Naked Continent Charity Project DVD sold.

However, after returning from Africa and editing the video, Natural High ran into problems. Japanese AV producers belong to one of several voluntary ethics organizations which police video content and the mosaic pixelation to obscure the genitals required in Japan. Natural High, like other SOD companies, belongs to the Content Soft Association (CSA) which was created by Soft On Demand. CSA insisted that the company use the mosaic on the faces of all children shown in the video since the video also contained sex scenes (the children were not present at any of the sex scenes). Director Sakkun said it was sad that all the children's smiling faces would have to be obscured.

When English language versions of the Japanese articles about the video appeared, they prompted commentary and expressions of moral outrage (from several different perspectives) about pornography and exploitation. These accounts all state or assume that the actress is having sex with "tribesmen", something not found in the original Japanese articles or the Natural High descriptions.

Notes

2000s pornographic films
Japanese erotic films
2006 films
2000s Japanese films